Flesh Field was an American electronic / industrial band formed in 1996 by Ian Ross in Columbus, Ohio, United States. The name Flesh Field is an unofficial term Ian Ross came up with to describe the psychological defense mechanisms of rape victims.

History
Rian Miller joined the band in 1997 to contribute female vocals. The band's debut album, Viral Extinction, peaked at #18 on the CMJ RPM Charts in the U.S. and ranked #31 on the German Alternative Charts (DAC) Top 50 Albums of year 2000. The followup EP, Redemption, peaked at #12 on the CMJ RPM Charts.

In 2004, Rian was replaced by another female vocalist, Wendy Yanko. Their 2004 album Strain peaked at number 4 on the 2005 DAC, charting for 8 weeks. In 2005, Flesh Field performed at the M'era Luna Festival in Hildesheim, Germany.

In January 2011, Ian Ross pronounced the retirement of Flesh Field as a musical project. Ian went on to further say that he will continue to make music, and that he is considering a new project.  Seven of the instrumentals for "Tyranny of the Majority" were released on the official Flesh Field website mastered along with two additional untitled instrumentals that were cut from the album. Two of the album's tracks, "Swarm" and "Forgotten Trauma" can be found on the albums, Dependence: Next Level Electronics: Volume 2 and Septic VI respectively.

Flesh Field's track "Beneath Contempt" appeared in season 5, episode 8 of the HBO show True Blood.

Members 
 Ian Ross - All Music, Lyrics, Vocals
 Wendy Yanko - Vocals
 Scott Tron/Matthias Ewald - Keyboards (live performances only)
 Josh Creamer - Guitar (live performances only)

Former members 
 Rian Miller - vocals

Discography

Albums
Viral Extinction: Inception Records / Trisol/Matrix Cube (1999)
Redemption EP: Inception Records / Trisol/Matrix Cube (2000)
Belief Control: Inception Records / Trisol/Matrix Cube (2001)
Strain: Metropolis Records / Dependent Records (2004)
Tyranny Of The Majority: Free internet release (instrumentals only) (2011)

Singles
"Beautifully Violent"

Internet release
Inferior EP: (2003)
Conquer Me EP: (2003)

Video game and television appearances
Haven: Project Gotham Racing 3 (2005)
Uprising: Crackdown (2007)
Forgotten Trauma: Project Gotham Racing 4 (2007)
Voice of Dissent (Remix): Trailer for The Club at the 2006 E3
Beneath Contempt: True Blood Season 5, Episode 8 "Somebody that I Used to Know" (2012)

References

External links 
 Flesh Field official homepage
 Flesh Field page in VK
 Discogs page
 Flesh Field official Myspace page
 Flesh Field official Vampirefreaks page
 
 2005 Interview with Jeremy Eckhart of Grave Concerns

Electronic music groups from Ohio
Musical groups from Columbus, Ohio
Metropolis Records artists
Dependent Records artists